Daguan may refer to:

Daguan County, in Zhaotong, Yunnan, China
Daguan District, in Anqing, Anhui, China
Daguan Park in Kunming, China.
Daguan Yuan, a large garden in the classic novel Dream of the Red Chamber
 Daguan, an era name of the Chinese Song dynasty emperor, Huizong of Song